Nowy Folwark  (German Sandvorwerk) is a village in the administrative district of Gmina Namysłów, within Namysłów County, Opole Voivodeship, in south-western Poland.

See also
Vorwerk (fortification)

References

Nowy Folwark